Adwaba are agricultural villages in Mauritania, mainly inhabited by former slaves and other lower castes. A large of proportion of Mauritania's rural poor is made up of adwaba.

Literature

See also 

 Slavery in Mauritania

References

External links 
 
 www.minorityvoices.org Mauritania: MRG visits Haratine community as part of campaign to end slavery

Society of Mauritania
Slavery in Africa